Land reform refers to efforts to reform the ownership and regulation of land in India. Or, those lands which are redistributed by the government from landholders to landless people for agriculture or special purpose is known as Land Reform.

Goals 
Land distribution has been part of India's state policy from the very beginning. Independent India's most revolutionary land policy was perhaps the abolition of the Zamindari system (feudal landholding practices). Land-reform policy in India had two specific objectives:
"The first is to remove such impediments to increase in agricultural production as arise from the agrarian structure inherited from the past. The second objective, which is closely related to the first, is to eliminate all elements of exploitation and social injustice within the agrarian system, to provide security for the tiller of the soil and assure equality of status and opportunity to all sections of the rural population.” (Government of India 1961 as quoted by Appu 1996)

Categories 
There are six main categories of reforms: 
 Abolition of intermediaries (rent collectors under the pre-Independence land revenue system); 
 Tenancy regulation (to improve the contractual terms including the security of tenure); 
 A ceiling on landholdings (to redistributing surplus land to the landless); 
 Attempts to consolidate disparate landholdings;
encouragement of cooperative joint farming;
settlement and regulation of tenancy.

History 
Since its independence in 1947, there has been voluntary and state-initiated/mediated land reforms in several states with dual objective of efficient use of land  and ensuring social justice. The most notable and successful example of land reforms are in the states of West Bengal and Kerala. Other than these state-sponsored attempts of reforming land ownership and control, there was another attempt to bring changes in the regime which achieved limited success; famously known as Bhoodan movement (Government of India, Ministry of Rural Development 2003, Annex XXXIX). Some other research has shown that during the movement, in the Vidarbha region, 14 per cent of the land records are incomplete, thus prohibiting transfer to the poor. 24 per cent of the land promised had never actually become part of the movement. The Gramdan which arguably took place in 160,000 pockets did not legalise the process under the state laws (Committee on Land Reform 2009, 77, Ministry of Rural Development).

Soon United Front came into power in West Bengal on 1967 the Communist Party of India (Marxist) leader Hare Krishna Konar and Benoy Choudhury started the India's first land reform on 1967 this was enacted upto the united front loss its power on 1971 and after 6 years in 1977, the Communist Party of India (Marxist) (CPI(M)) kept their word and initiated gradual land reforms, such as Operation Barga. The result was a more equitable distribution of land among the landless farmers, and enumeration of landless farmers. This has ensured an almost lifelong loyalty from the farmers and the communists were in power till 2011 assembly election.

In land reform in Kerala, the only other large state where the CPI(M) came to power, state administrations have actually carried out the most extensive land, tenancy and agrarian labour wage reforms in the non-socialist late-industrialising world. Another successful land reform program was launched in Jammu and Kashmir after 1947.

All in all, land reforms have been successful only in pockets of the country, as people have often found loopholes in the laws that set limits on the maximum area of land that is allowed to be held by any one person.

Ernest Feder, a specialist of rural economics, has said of the matter:

"...though since 1947, India has enacted perhaps more land reform legislation than any other country in the world, it has not succeeded in changing in any essentials the power pattern, the deep economic disparities, nor the traditional hierarchical nature of intergroup relationships which govern the economic life of village society."

Land ceilings
The following table shows land ceilings for each state in India.

See also 
 Land reform in Kerala
 Right to Fair Compensation and Transparency in Land Acquisition, Rehabiliation, and Resettlement Act, 2013

References 

India
Land management in India
Reform in India